Gorny Institute, also spelled Gornyi Institut, is a stratovolcano located in the Sredinny Range on Russia's Kamchatka Peninsula. It lies just east of the Titila volcano and north of the Kebeney volcano.

The volcano is named after the St. Petersburg State Mining Institute which was established by Catherine the Great to oversee the study of mining and mountain geology.

See also
 List of volcanoes in Russia

References

Mountains of the Kamchatka Peninsula
Volcanoes of the Kamchatka Peninsula
Stratovolcanoes of Russia
Holocene stratovolcanoes
Holocene Asia